The word Finn (pl. Finns) usually refers to a member of the majority Balto-Finnic ethnic group of Finland, or to a person from Finland.

Finn may also refer to:

Places
 Finn Lake, Minnesota, United States
 Finn Township, Logan County, North Dakota, United States
 Lough Finn, a freshwater lough (lake) in County Donegal, Ireland
 River Finn (County Donegal), Ireland
 River Finn (Erne tributary), a tributary of the Erne River, Ireland

People 
 Finn, an old Scandinavian ethnonym for the Sami people
 Finn (given name), including a list of people with the given name
 Finn (surname), English and German-language surname

Mythological figures
 Finn (dog), an English police dog and namesake of "Finn's Law" providing legal protection for animals in public service
 Finn (Frisian), Frisian king who appears in Beowulf and the Finnesburg Fragment
 Fionn mac Cumhaill (Old Irish: Finn mac Cumhal; anglicised to Finn McCool), a warrior in Irish mythology
 Various legendary High Kings of Ireland
 Eber Finn, 1700 BC (AFM), 1287–1286 BC (FFE)
 Cearmna Finn, 1533–1493 BC (AFM), 1155–1115 BC (FFE)
 Finn mac Blatha, 952–930 BC (AFM), 725–705 BC (FFE)
 Duach Finn, 904–894 BC (AFM), 679–674 BC (FFE)
 Ailill Finn, 795–786 BC (AFM), 586–577 BC (FFE)
 Fiatach Finn, 36–39 AD (AFM), 25–28 AD (FFE)

Arts entertainment, and media

Characters
 Finn (comics), the titular character in the eponymous comic strip in the British comic anthology 2000 AD
 Finn (Misfits), one of the protagonists of the British TV series Misfits 
 Finn (Star Wars), in the Star Wars films
 Finn the Human, one of the protagonists in the animated series Adventure Time
 Huckleberry Finn, a protagonist in the novels The Adventures of Tom Sawyer and Adventures of Huckleberry Finn
 Phineas Finn, protagonist of Anthony Trollope's novels Phineas Finn and Phineas Redux
 Finn Collins, in The 100 TV series
 Finn DeTrolio, in the TV series The Sopranos
 Finn Dodd, protagonist of the film How to Make an American Quilt and the novel of the same title
 Finn Hudson, in the television show Glee
 Finn McMissile, in the movie Cars 2
 Finn O'Connor (Hollyoaks), in the British soap opera Hollyoaks
 Finn Sharkey, in the TV series Waterloo Road
 Finn Whitman, in The Kingdom Keepers children's novel series
 Finn, a goldfish mascot in the Goldfish crackers brand
 Finn, in the Jackie Chan Adventures TV series
 Finn, in The Lego Movie franchise
 Finn, the wizard in the 1842 opera Ruslan and Lyudmila
 Finn, in the animated TV series Storm Hawks
 Finn, in the South Korean-Japanese cartoon series Tai Chi Chasers
 Finn, a character in the novel What I Was by Meg Rosoff
 The Finn, in William Gibson's science fiction Sprawl trilogy novels
 Finn, in the animated series Arcane

Music
 Finn (album), a 1995 album by the Finn Brothers
 "Finn", a song by Tori Amos for the 1998 Great Expectations soundtrack

Other uses in arts, entertainment, and media
 Finn: A Novel, a 2007 novel by Jon Clinch
 Finn.no, a Norwegian classified advertisements website
 "Finn", an episode in the television series The Lost World
 Farnborough International News Network (FINN), an aviation trade website published by Farnborough International Ltd

Other uses
 Finn (dinghy), an Olympic class of sailing dinghy
 Finn, a variant of fin, a colloquial term for the U.S. five dollar bill
 The Finn (1912–1925), an American Thoroughbred racehorse

See also
 
 
 Fin (disambiguation) 
 Fine (disambiguation)
 Finny (disambiguation)
 Flynn